Capparis sandwichiana is a species of flowering plant in the Capparaceae family endemic to the Hawaiian Islands. Common names include maiapilo, pua pilo, and Hawaiian caper. C. sandwichiana can be found on the main islands, Midway Atoll, the Pearl and Hermes Atoll, and Laysan. Maiapilo is listed as vulnerable by the IUCN and is threatened by grazing, competition with invasive species, and habitat destruction.

References

External links

sandwichiana
Endemic flora of Hawaii
Plants described in 1824
Taxonomy articles created by Polbot
Taxa named by Augustin Pyramus de Candolle